Bad Guy is a 2010 South Korean melodrama television series, starring Kim Nam-gil, Han Ga-in, Kim Jae-wook, Oh Yeon-soo and Jung So-min. Directed by Lee Hyung-min, it aired on SBS from May 26 to August 5, 2010 on Wednesdays and Thursdays at 21:55 for 17 episodes.

Plot
In one night, Gun-wook (Kim Nam-gil) lost everything because of the Hong family. They took him in, believing he was President Hong's illegitimate son Tae-sung, and then cast him aside into the streets when it turned out to be a mistake. Years later, Gun-wook returns for revenge, taking down the Hongs and their Haeshin corporation step by step. The real Hong Tae-sung (Kim Jae-wook) and sisters Mo-ne (Jung So-min) and Tae-ra (Oh Yeon-soo) are all chess pieces in his impeccable revenge plan, but he never planned on meeting and falling in love with the smart and equally ambitious Jae-in (Han Ga-in).

Cast

Main characters
 Kim Nam-gil as Shim Gun-wook
Kang Soo-han as young Gun-wook 
 Han Ga-in as Moon Jae-in
 Kim Jae-wook as Hong Tae-sung
Park Joon-mok as young Tae-sung 
 Oh Yeon-soo as Hong Tae-ra
Moon Ga-young as young Tae-ra 
 Jung So-min as Hong Mo-ne

Supporting characters
Kim Hye-ok as Mrs. Shin
Jeon Gook-hwan as President Hong
Shim Eun-kyung as Moon Weon-in 
Ji Hoo as Lee Beom-woo
Chae Gun as young Beom-woo
Kim Min-seo as Choi Sun-young
Lee Ji-eun as young Sun-young
Kim Jung-tae as Jang Gam-dok
Ha Joo-hee as Jeon Hye-joo
Park Ah-in as Da-rim
Jung Seung-oh as Uhm Sang-moo
Jeon Min-seo as Hong So-dam, Tae-ra's daughter
Song Ji-eun as Gun-wook's mother
Song Joo-yeon as Song Joo-yeon
Uhm Tae-goo as Tae-ra's bodyguard
Joo Jin-mo

Production
In analyzing his character Gun-wook, Kim Nam-gil described him as "an innocent but bad guy," saying, "You can't hate him because while his actions may be based on vengeance; he's actually lonely and is longing for love." About portraying the pretty, smart and ambitious Moon Jae-in, Han Ga-in said she "accepted the role in the drama because I wasn't scared to brush off my goddess image from commercials." Hong Tae-ra's mundane life is shattered when she falls for Gun-wook, and Oh Yeon-soo admitted feeling nervous about her love scene with Kim.

Regarding the racy kissing scene between him and Oh, Kim commented that "Actually, I thought it would be good if it were steamy. I wanted to give this married woman with a child and a family a dangerous fantasy, or even a vicarious sense of satisfaction." He added that he prefers working with married women than single ones, saying, "The difference between shooting a melodrama with married and single actresses are they themselves seem to feel more comfortable and talk openly. It gives us a chance to become close and talk about this and that while not having to worry about getting involved in a scandal. In a way, married people are my seniors in life so I can learn a lot from them. I want to shoot more melodramas with married actresses from now on."

In the middle of filming, Kim received his draft notice for mandatory military service. He applied for a deferment in order to wrap up the shoot for the series, but it was not granted. Kim shot as much as he could (his scenes were reduced, and a body double was also used) until July 13, then entered the army two days later on July 15, 2010.

Ratings

Awards and nominations

International broadcast
It was later broadcast in its original Korean audio with Japanese subtitles on the main terrestrial channel NHK starting September 4, 2011, airing two episodes a day from Monday to Thursday for a total of two weeks. NHK was also one of the drama's investors.

It aired in Taiwan on Gala TV beginning October 5, 2011.

It aired in Thailand on Modern Nine TV every Monday to Friday at 1:00 p.m. starting from March 2, 2012.

References

External links
 Bad Guy official SBS website 
 
 

Seoul Broadcasting System television dramas
2010 South Korean television series debuts
Korean-language television shows
2010 South Korean television series endings
South Korean melodrama television series